William Sedgewick (born February 11, 1971) is an American former professional soccer player who played both indoors and outdoors.

College
Born in Wheat Ridge, Colorado, Sedgewick attended Westminster College in Salt Lake City, graduating in 1994 with a degree in business finance.

Player
In May 1994, Sedgwick turned professional with the Portland Pride in the Continental Indoor Soccer League, playing two seasons with Portland. In 1995, he moved to the Chicago Power of the National Professional Soccer League. He later played for the Edmonton Drillers, Montreal Impact and Rochester Rhinos. He returned to the Impact in 2006 for one season, on loan from the California Cougars. The Cougars folded during the summer and in September 2006, the Detroit Ignition selected Sedgewick in the MISL Dispersal Draft. In July 2007, the expansion Orlando Sharks selected Sedgewick fourth in the MISL Expansion Draft.  In March 2008, he returned to the Detroit Ignition.

Coach
On January 4, 2010, Sedgewick was named an assistant coach for the Rochester Rhinos.  He left this position after the 2012 season to pursue opportunities in Montreal.

References

1971 births
Living people
People from Wheat Ridge, Colorado
American Professional Soccer League players
American expatriate sportspeople in Canada
American expatriate soccer players
American soccer players
California Cougars players
Chicago Power players
Colorado Foxes players
Continental Indoor Soccer League players
Detroit Ignition (MISL) players
Edmonton Drillers (1996–2000) players
Expatriate soccer players in Canada
Major Indoor Soccer League (2001–2008) players
Montreal Impact (1992–2011) players
National Professional Soccer League (1984–2001) players
Orlando Sharks (MISL) players
Portland Pride players
Rochester New York FC players
Soccer players from Colorado
Westminster College (Utah) alumni
A-League (1995–2004) players
USL First Division players
Association football defenders
American expatriate soccer coaches
Expatriate soccer managers in Canada